Morán Morán is a contemporary art gallery in Los Angeles, United States. It was founded in 2008 as OHWOW by Al Moran, and was later renamed. The gallery began as an alliance of artists and curators, presenting various exhibitions, happenings, and publications before evolving into what it is today. The Los Angeles gallery is currently located at 641 N. Western Avenue, Los Angeles, CA 90004.

About 
As of spring 2011, Morán Morán opened a gallery location in Los Angeles, designed by New York City architect Rafael de Cárdenas. In 2021, the gallery opened a second gallery space located in the Polanco area of Mexico City, Mexico.

Former partner Aaron Bondaroff resigned from the gallery in February 2018 after multiple accusations of inappropriate sexual behavior towards women. The gallery's name was changed from Morán Bondaroff to Morán Morán.

References

External links
 

Art museums and galleries in Los Angeles
Contemporary art galleries in the United States
Art galleries established in 2008
2008 establishments in the United States